Patrick Doyle (died October 1964) was an Irish Fine Gael politician. He was a member of Seanad Éireann from 1938 to 1948. He was elected to the 2nd Seanad in March 1938 by the Cultural and Educational Panel. He was re-elected at the August 1938, 1943 and 1944 Seanad elections. He did not contest the 1948 Seanad election.

References

Year of birth missing
1964 deaths
20th-century Irish medical doctors
Members of the 2nd Seanad
Members of the 3rd Seanad
Members of the 4th Seanad
Members of the 5th Seanad
Fine Gael senators